The Rogue River is a tributary of the South Yamhill River in Polk County, Oregon, United States. It is sometimes referred to as Rogue Creek.

It was named for the Rogue River Indians who lived along its banks after they were forced to move from Southern Oregon to the nearby Grand Ronde Indian Reservation.

Its headwaters are on the northeast face of Saddleback Mountain, elevation .

See also
 List of rivers of Oregon

References

External links
Yamhill Basin Council

Rivers of Oregon
Rivers of Polk County, Oregon